The cinereous tit (Parus cinereus) is a species of bird in the tit family Paridae. This species is made up of several populations that were earlier treated as subspecies of the great tit (Parus major). These birds are grey backed with white undersides. The great tit in the new sense is distinguishable by the greenish-back and yellowish underside. The distribution of this species extends from parts of West Asia across South Asia and into Southeast Asia.

Description

Like others in the genus, it has a broad black ventral line and has no crest. This tit is part of a confusing group of species but is distinct in having a grey-back, black hood, white cheek patch and a white wing-bar. The underparts are white with the black central stripe running along the length. The female has a narrower ventral line and is slightly duller. The upper tail coverts are ashy while the tail is black with the central 4 pairs of feathers ashy on the outer webs and all but the central pair are tipped white. The fifth pair is white with a black rachis and a band of black on the inner web. The outermost pair of tail feathers are all white with a black shaft. The undertail coverts are black towards the centre but white on the sides.

Taxonomy and systematics
Several of the subspecies formerly placed within Parus major are now placed in this species (all of which have a grey rather than greenish back as adults, although young birds show some green on the back and yellowish on the underside ). These geographically separated populations show differences mainly in the shade of grey, the extent of white on the tail feathers and in size, although the variation in size is mainly clinal:
 cinereus Vieillot, 1818 nominate form from Java and the Lesser Sundas
 intermedius Zarudny, 1890 - Iran and Turkmenistan
 decolorans Koelz, 1939 - Afghanistan and Pakistan.
 ziaratensis Whistler, 1929 - southern Afghanistan and west Pakistan (very pale and bluish, approaching Parus bokharensis)
 caschmirensis E. J. O. Hartert, 1905 - Western Himalayas (has a grey nuchal patch)
 nipalensis Hodgson, 1837 - Subhimalayas (includes planorum of the Punjab plains)
 vauriei Ripley, 1950 - NE Indian Subcontinent
 stupae Koelz, 1939 - Peninsular India
 mahrattarum E. J. O. Hartert, 1905 - Western Ghats and Sri Lanka
 templorum Meyer de Schauensee, 1946 - W Thailand and S Indochina
 hainanus E. J. O. Hartert, 1905 - Hainan I.
 ambiguus (Raffles, 1822) - Malay Peninsula and Sumatra
 sarawacensis Slater, 1885 - Borneo

Behaviour and ecology

These birds are usually seen in pairs or small groups that sometimes join mixed-species foraging flocks. They forage mainly by gleaning, capturing insects (mainly caterpillars, bugs and beetles) that are disturbed and will also feeding on buds and fruits. They sometimes use their feet to hold insects which are then torn with their beak. They may also wedge hard seeds in a bark crevice before hammering them with their beak (noted in ssp. caschmirensis).

The calls are a whistling titiweesi...titiweesi... witsi-seesee or other variants repeated three of four times followed by a break. The calling is particularly persistent during the breeding season. In playback experiments, the churring alarm calls of the European Parus major and Asian species are responded to by each other but the songs of the European species do not elicit much response in P. c. mahrattarum. About 4 to 6 eggs form the normal clutch (9 recorded in caschmirensis with one case of two nests side by side). The breeding season is summer and but dates vary across their range. Some birds may raise more than one brood. In southern India and Sri Lanka the breeding season is February to May (mainly before the Monsoons) but nests have also been seen from September to November. The nests are placed in hollows in trees or in a wall or mud-bank with a narrow entrance hole and the floor of the cavity is lined with moss, hair and feathers. They sometimes make use of the old nest of a woodpecker or barbet. Both parents take part in incubation and hissing from within the nest when threatened. They may also roost in cavities such as those in cut bamboo.
 
A species of flea Ceratophyllus gallinae has been recorded in their nests from India.

References

External links

 Worldbird names
 Internet Bird Collection

cinereous tit
Birds of South Asia
Birds of Southeast Asia
cinereous tit
Taxa named by Louis Jean Pierre Vieillot